Zoo station is a CTrain light rail station in Calgary, Alberta, Canada. It is on the Blue Line between Bridgeland/Memorial and Barlow/Max Bell stations. It opened on April 22, 1985 as part of the original Blue Line. The station serves the Calgary Zoo, the Telus Spark science museum as well as the community of Bridgeland.

Location and station layout 
The station has a single island platform. The station is located between the two lanes of Memorial Drive, with a tunnel connecting the station north to its park and ride and another tunnel connecting the station south to the Calgary Zoo.

Art 
Stylistically, the design of Zoo station differs from the other stations in the CTrain system as it incorporates images of animals and dinosaurs. The station's Island platform is accessed via ramps leading up from a tunnel below Memorial Drive. The tunnel below Memorial Drive also houses several permanent zoo-related exhibits.

History 
As part of Calgary Transit's plan to operate 4-car trains by the end of 2014, all 3-car platforms are being extended. Zoo station will also see new furnishings in addition to a platform extension. Construction started in early 2014 and lasted approximately 6 months.

Renovations to the station began in September 2017 and were completed in March 2019, with the station remaining open with no disruption to service. The renovations included new wall, ceiling, and floor finishes, enhanced security, including new CCTV cameras, lighting, mechanical, and electrical upgrades, a new public announcement system, new station signs, upgraded station doors, backup power capabilities, and a new roofing system.

References

CTrain stations
Railway stations in Canada opened in 1985
1985 establishments in Alberta